HaMerkaz HaHakla'i (lit. The Agricultural Centre) is a settlement movement in Israel. 

The 151 members of HaMerkaz HaHakla'i are selected every four years by a conference of 501 members of the Agricultural Workers Union, which was established in 1919. The organisation is headed by a 21-member secretariat.

After the Histadrut was established in 1920, the Agricultural Workers Union became one of its central components. This arrangement lasted until 1994, when the two organisations separated.

See also
Agriculture in Israel

References

1919 establishments in British-administered Palestine
Settlement movements in Israel
Agriculture in Israel